KOLS-LP is a low power radio station broadcasting a Catholic radio format out of Oakhurst, California.

History
KOLS-LP began broadcasting on 5 February 2014.

References

External links
 

Madera, California
2015 establishments in California
OLS-LP
Radio stations established in 2015
OLS-LP